Francis Florin Bălan (born 1 February 2002) is a Romanian professional footballer who plays as a midfielder for Liga I club FC Voluntari. He made his debut in Liga I on 3 February 2019, in a match between FC Voluntari and Sepsi OSK Sfântu Gheorghe, ended with the score of 4–2.

Honours

Afumați 
Liga III: 2021–22

References

External links
 
 
 

2002 births
Living people
Footballers from Bucharest
Romanian footballers
Association football midfielders
Liga I players
FC Voluntari players
Liga II players
FCV Farul Constanța players
Liga III players
CS Afumați players